Yoo In-soo (born April 22, 1998) is a South Korean actor. He is known for his roles in dramas such as Strong Girl Bong-soon (2017), Gangnam Beauty (2018), At a Distance, Spring Is Green (2021), All of Us Are Dead (2022), and Alchemy of Souls (2022–2023).

Filmography

Film

Television series

Web series

Awards and nominations

References

External links 
 
 

1998 births
Living people
21st-century South Korean male actors
South Korean male television actors
South Korean male film actors
South Korean male web series actors